Alex MacDougall is an American record producer, and percussionist. MacDougall is best known for being a member of the Christian rock band Daniel Amos in the late-1970s in addition to his production and recording session credits. He was also a member of Selah, The Way, Salvation Air Force, The Richie Furay Band, The Randy Stonehill Band and The Larry Norman Band.

Career
MacDougall toured as part of the Richie Furay Band in 1976.

Following his departure from Daniel Amos, MacDougall toured for a year with singer/guitarist/artist Bob Bennett.

In addition to current advisory roles, MacDougall serves as an adjunct professor at Dallas Baptist University, as part of the Music Business Degree program.

MacDougall has created and developed music concepts and projects for Time-Life, Guideposts, Reader's Digest, Publishers Clearing House, Avon, EMI/Capitol Special Markets and Integrity Media, Inc.  He also worked on the original 3 WOW WORSHIP projects (Blue, Orange, Green), as an A&R and Marketing Committee member.  Production and co-production credits also include the Billboard-charting Gospel Goes Classical (DVD and CD), Generation Unleashed, Top 25 Gospel Praise and Worship Songs, It's A Wonderful Christmas and Top 40 Christian Favorites.  In 2011 he joined Bill Batstone and Bob Bennett in a recording project entitled, "Jesus Music Again".  Jesus Music Again reinterprets some of the great songs from the Jesus Movement of the 1970s in a loving tribute.  Many guest artists appear as well, including Phil Keaggy and Linda McCrary.

References

External links 
 Full Circle Jesus Music Podcast interview with Alex MacDougall

Year of birth missing (living people)
Living people
American percussionists
American male musicians
American record producers
Daniel Amos members